Kasaplar is a village of Devrekani District in Kastamonu Province, Turkey. Its population is 142 (2022). It is 33 km from Kastamonu and 3 km from Devrekani.

Population

References 

Villages in Devrekani District